The Village of Stirling is located in Alberta, Canada and has close to 1,000 inhabitants. Being one of only three communities in Canada that are designated National historic status, tourism is a very important part of Stirling's economy.

Attractions and landmarks
The following is a list of attractions and landmarks in or near Stirling, Alberta, Canada.

Events and festivals

The following is a list of annual events held throughout  Stirling. The dates and addresses may change.

See also
 Festivals in Alberta
 List of national historic sites of Canada
 List of provincial historic sites of Alberta
 Stirling Agricultural Village
 Tourism in Alberta
 Tourism in Canada

References

External links
 Map of historic sites in Stirling
 Village of Stirling
 Stirling's historical Landmarks

 
Stirling

Tourist attractions in Alberta
Stirling